The Friendly Guide to Music is a 'beginner's guide' to classical music, voiced by English actor and presenter Tony Robinson.  It covers the period from early music, Medieval and Renaissance music, to the modern era, 20th-century classical music, contemporary classical music, and 21st-century classical music, and its objective is to create a guide to music that is not needlessly complex.

External links
 Podcast

Music guides
Music textbooks